Alcohol intolerance is due to a genetic polymorphism of the aldehyde dehydrogenase enzyme, which is responsible for the metabolism of acetaldehyde (produced from the metabolism of alcohol by alcohol dehydrogenase). This polymorphism is most often reported in patients of East Asian descent. Alcohol intolerance may also be an associated side effect of certain drugs such as disulfiram, metronidazole, or nilutamide. Skin flushing and nasal congestion are the most common symptoms of intolerance after alcohol ingestion. It may also be characterized as intolerance causing hangover symptoms similar to the "disulfiram-like reaction" of aldehyde dehydrogenase deficiency or chronic fatigue syndrome. Severe pain after drinking alcohol may indicate a more serious underlying condition.

Drinking alcohol in addition to consuming calcium cyanamide can cause permanent or long-lasting intolerance (nitrolime disease), contributing (in conjunction with other substances) to the accumulation of harmful acetaldehyde in the body by inhibiting the acetaldehyde dehydrogenase enzyme.

Signs and symptoms 
Individuals with alcohol intolerance will experience unpleasant reactions immediately after drinking alcohol. Common signs and symptoms of alcohol intolerance include nasal congestion, skin flushing (redness), headaches, low blood pressure, nausea, and vomiting.

Causes

Genetics 

ALDH1 is an isozyme of aldehyde dehydrogenase. A structural mutation in the gene of ALDH1, commonly found in East Asians, results in low levels of functional ALDH1 enzyme and thus, higher blood acetaldehyde levels. Higher blood acetaldehyde levels have been associated with facial flushing caused by an increase in heart rate and blood flow to the face from vasodilation of the blood vessels. Individuals that have the ALDH2*2 allele, a variant that has a mutation when compared to the wild-type ALDH2 isozyme, are known to have higher blood acetaldehyde levels. Individuals that have either mutation in the ALDH1 or ALDH2 genes may have slightly different blood acetaldehyde levels among others carrying a similar mutation and may experience varying degrees of alcohol intolerance symptoms.

Risk factors 
Various genetic and environmental factors exist that can lead to an increased risk for developing alcohol intolerance. Individuals with two copies of the ALDH2*2 allele are known to have high blood acetaldehyde levels and experience “hangover” symptoms such as heart palpitations for longer durations, even with low alcohol consumption. Individuals who work with DMF have shown a dose-related increase in alcohol intolerance complaints. Exposure to DMF can also cause facial flushing and increased sensitivity to alcohol.

Diagnosis

Ethanol patch test 
In an ethanol patch test, different concentrations of ethanol are applied onto lint pads and attached to the inner surface of the upper arm for several minutes. If skin redness occurs after 10-15 minutes, the individual is deemed to have a lack of ALDH1 associated with alcohol intolerance.

Difference from alcohol allergy 
Alcohol intolerance is not an allergy. There are often misconceptions that alcohol intolerance and alcohol allergy are the same, but they are not. Alcohol intolerance is an inherited genetic disorder that impairs alcohol metabolism. The increased accumulation of acetaldehyde in affected individuals due to deficient aldehyde dehydrogenase enzymes often leads to the characteristic symptom of having flushed skin. On the other hand, the more uncommon alcohol allergy is an immune system reaction to alcohol (specifically ethanol) that causes symptoms such as rashes, difficulty breathing, and anaphylaxis in severe cases. Nausea is a symptom common to both alcohol intolerance and alcohol allergy. Remarkably, inhaled isopropyl alcohol can be used to provide nausea and vomiting relief.

Management 
Avoiding or restricting alcohol is the most straightforward way to prevent the symptoms of alcohol intolerance. Tobacco use or exposure to secondhand smoke should be avoided, as smoking may increase levels of acetaldehyde. Certain medications may interact with alcohol and worsen symptoms. Antacid or antihistamines are used to reduce the symptoms of alcohol intolerance. However, these medications simply mask these symptoms. Reducing alcohol consumption lowers the risk for cancer and other serious diseases.

See also

 Disulfiram-like drug
 Alcohol flush reaction
 Alcohol tolerance
 Alcohol (drug)

References

Symptoms and signs
Alcohol and health